Kottaaram Vilkkaanundu is a 1975 Indian Malayalam-language film,  directed by K. Suku and produced by Jameena. The film stars Prem Nazir, Jayabharathi, Bahadoor, KP Ummer, Adoor Bhasi and Thikkurissy Sukumaran Nair. The film has musical score by G. Devarajan.

Cast

Prem Nazir
Jayabharathi
Bahadoor
K. P. Ummer
Adoor Bhasi
Thikkurissy Sukumaran Nair
Sreelatha Namboothiri
T. R. Omana
Kunchan

Soundtrack

References

External links
 

1975 films
1970s Malayalam-language films